{| 

{{Infobox ship characteristics
| Hide header = 
| Header caption = 
| Ship class = 
| Ship tons burthen = 298,<ref name=RS1805>[https://hdl.handle.net/2027/mdp.39015021233559?urlappend=%3Bseq=86 Register of Shipping (1805), Seq. №379.]</ref> or 301, or 305 (bm)
| Ship length = 
| Ship beam = 
| Ship draught = 
| Ship draft = 
| Ship hold depth = 
| Ship propulsion = 
| Ship sail plan = 
| Ship complement = 
| Ship armament = *1795:6 × 4-pounder guns
1805:6 × 4-pounder guns
1815:2 × 18-pounder + 2 × 12-pounder carronades
| Ship notes = 
}}
|}Boddingtons, or Boddington, was a merchantman that was launched in 1793 upon the Thames River for Boddingtons. She spent most of her career as a West Indiaman. She did make one voyage to Australia carrying passengers. Her crew abandoned her at sea in November 1840.

CareerBoddingtons enters Lloyd's Register in 1794 with  P. Scallon, master, Boddingtons, owner, and trade London—Nevis.Boddington, Soal, master, bound for St Vincent, put into Plymouth on 1 February 1804. She was part of a fleet of 43 sail under the escort of the 74-gun  that had left Portsmouth on 2 January, bound for the West Indies. For some reason, the whole fleet put back into Plymouth. Still, Boddington reportedly put into Cork, Ireland, on 3 February.

On 17 February 1807 Boddingtons was driven ashore between Deal and South Foreland, Kent.

On the morning of 16 December 1821 Boddingtons was in ballast when she caught fire at St. Catherine's Stairs, Wapping. Her crew scuttled her and afterwards her main and mizzen masts were cut away. Lloyd's Register for 1823 carries the notation that Boddingtons was rebuilt in 1822.

Her owner, John Marshall, of 26 Birchin Lane, Cornhill, was the most active colonial emigration agent before the formation in 1840 of the Colonial Land and Emigration Commission.

Under the command of J. Taylor, Boddingtons sailed from London on 1 October 1827, stopping at the Cape of Good Hope and arrived at Hobart Town on 14 March 1828, with cargo and passengers. She left Hobart Town and arrived at Sydney on 22 April, carrying cargo, passengers and a number of convicts. She left Port Jackson on 2 September bound for London.

FateLloyd's Register for 1840 shows Boddingtons, now with homeport of Whitby, as having been "Abandoned". The Naval Journal reported that the barque Boddingtons'', of Whitby, was abandoned at sea on 14 November 1840. Her crew of 14 was taken off.

Notes, citations, and reference
Notes

Citations

References
 
 

1793 ships
Ships built on the River Thames
Age of Sail merchant ships
Merchant ships of the United Kingdom
Convict ships to New South Wales
Maritime incidents in 1807
Maritime incidents in December 1821
Maritime incidents in November 1840
Ship fires
Scuttled vessels